Bernd Truntschka (born 7 August 1965) is a German former ice hockey player. He competed in the men's tournaments at the 1988 Winter Olympics, the 1992 Winter Olympics and the 1994 Winter Olympics.

References

External links
 

1965 births
Living people
German ice hockey players
Olympic ice hockey players of West Germany
Olympic ice hockey players of Germany
Ice hockey players at the 1988 Winter Olympics
Ice hockey players at the 1992 Winter Olympics
Ice hockey players at the 1994 Winter Olympics
Sportspeople from Landshut